The 1983 IBF World Championships (World Badminton Championships) were held in Copenhagen, Denmark.  Men's doubles results are listed.

Main stage

Section 1

Section 2

Section 3

Section 4

Final stage

External links 
 First round
 Second round
 Third round
 Quarterfinals

1983 IBF World Championships